Pipina Bonasera (Sicily, 1838–1927) was a Greek stage actress. She belonged to the pioneer generation of modern Greek theater and was one of the first professional Greek actresses as well as one of the first female theater stars of her country. She was also the first theater director of her sex in Greece.

Life
Pipina Bonasera is noted to have been active as an actress on the Boukoura Theatre in Athens in 1862, when she performed the main role in Lucrezia Borgia by Victor Hugo. She was reportedly a member of the first professional Greek theater company. The company was dissolved later the same year, after which the Greek actors formed a new company and acted in Istanbul and the Greek cities in the Eastern Mediterranean until they returned to Greece in 1865.

For the next twenty years after 1862, she was a star of the Greek theater, known especially for her roles in the works of Demetrius Vernardaki. She composed her own theater company in collaboration with Dimosthenis Alexiadis, thereby becoming the first female theater director in Greece, and toured the Eastern Mediterranean. It was not until after the liberation of Ottoman rule that the theater in Greece could establish itself; the first (temporary) theater was not erected in Athens before 1836, and the first actresses did not appear until 1840. As the Greek upper classes preferred visiting Italian and French theater companies, however, the Greek theater had difficulty to establish outside of travelling companies in the 19th century.

Pipina Bonasera was also active as a translator of Italian plays to Greek.

References

Sources
 Αλεξία Αλτουβά: Πιπίνα Βονασέρα - Σοφία Ταβουλάρη. Συγκριτικά σχόλια σε δυο παράλληλες πορείες

1838 births
1927 deaths
19th-century Greek actresses
Greek actresses
People from Sicily
Italian expatriates in Greece
19th-century theatre managers